Drifting may refer to:
Drifting (motorsport)
Pipe drift or drifting, measuring a pipe's inner roundness

Film
Drifting (1923 film), a film directed by Tod Browning
Drifting (1982 film), the first Israeli gay-themed film
Drifting (2021 film), a film directed by Jun Li

Music
"Drifting" (Plumb song), 2011
"Drifting" (G-Eazy song), 2016
"Driftin' Blues", a 1968 blues song recorded by Charles Brown & Johnny Moore's Three Blazers, Eric Clapton and others
"Drifting", a song by Jimi Hendrix on his album The Cry of Love
"Drifting", a song by 4 Non Blondes on their album Bigger, Better, Faster, More!
"Drifting", a song by Salmonella Dub on their album Killervision
"Drifting", a song by Pearl Jam on their album Lost Dogs
"Drifting", a song by Enya on her album Amarantine

See also
Drift (disambiguation) 
Drifter (disambiguation)